Gearbulk Holding Limited is an international shipping company headquartered in Pfaeffikon, Switzerland.  The company operates the world's largest fleet of open hatch gantry and semi-open jib craned vessels.  These vessels specialise in carrying unitised breakbulk cargoes like forest products, non-ferrous metals, and steel.  The company also has a revenue stream in terminal operations.

Gearbulk was founded by Kristian Gerhard Jebsen of Bergen, Norway in 1968,
and took over the Dublin Shipping company in 1998.

Fleet
As of October 2014, the Gearbulk fleet consists of 64 vessels, most of which are "open hatch gantry craned (OHGC)" vessels.  Standardising on this design makes the vessels interchangeable, and offers operational flexibility.

Gearbulk also operates open hatch jib craned (Fleximax) vessels and several bulk carriers for general bulk cargoes.

Early 2015 Gearbulk lost the MS Bulk Jupiter when it sank off the coast of Vietnam.

List of ships
This is a dynamic list and may never be able to satisfy particular standards for completeness. You can help by expanding it with reliably sourced entries.

 Ibis Arrow (4th generation juice carrier)
 Aracari Arrow
 Jacamar Arrow
 Quetzal Arrow
 Hawk Arrow
 Jaegar Arrow
 Emu Arrow
 Kite Arrow
 Grebe Arrow
 Mandarin Arrow
 Merline Arrow
 Penguin Arrow
 Plover Arrow
 Toucan Arrow
 Weaver Arrow
 Corella Arrow
 Macuru Arrow
 Tenca Arrow
 Tuju Arrow 
 Canelo Arrow
 Cedar Arrow
 Pine Arrow
 Poplar Arrow

References

External links
 Gearbulk Shipping AS at Det Norske Veritas
 Gearbulk Shipowning Ltd. at Det Norske Veritas

Shipping companies of Switzerland